This is a list of Canadian films which were released in 1977:

See also
 1977 in Canada
 1977 in Canadian television

References

1977
1977 in Canadian cinema
Canada